The 1934 Hawaii Rainbows football team was an American football team that represented the University of Hawaii as an independent during the 1934 college football season.  In its 14th season under head coach Otto Klum, the team compiled a perfect 6–0 record, shut out four of six opponents, and outscored opponents by a total of 142 to 21. The team's victories included games against Denver (36–14) and California (14–0).

Tom Kaulukukui starred in the backfield for the 1934 team. His jersey number 32 was retired by the Hawaii football program.

Schedule

References

Hawaii
Hawaii Rainbow Warriors football seasons
College football undefeated seasons
Hawaii Rainbows football